Jilin, a province of the People's Republic of China, is made up of the following administrative divisions.

Administrative divisions
All of these administrative divisions are explained in greater detail at administrative divisions of China. This chart lists all prefecture-level and county-level divisions of Jilin.

Recent changes in administrative divisions

Population composition

Prefectures

Counties

References

 
Jilin